Mick Pyne (2 September 1940, in Thornton-le-Dale – 23 May 1995, in London) was an English jazz pianist. His brother was jazz musician Chris Pyne.

He learned piano from a very early age and could also play cornet and violin. He and his brother Chris formed their own band as teenagers before Mick moved to London from 1959 to 1961. He played briefly with Tony Kinsey in 1962, then played U.S. military bases in France, in addition to working with Alexis Korner, from 1962 to 1963.

Returning to London at the end of 1963, Pyne worked in the 1960s with John Stevens, Phil Seamen, and extensively with Tubby Hayes, in addition to doing European tours with Stan Getz, Roland Kirk, Lee Konitz, Hank Mobley, and Joe Williams. In the 1970s he worked with Hayes as well as with Ronnie Scott, Humphrey Lyttelton, John Eardley and Cecil Payne. In the 1980s Pyne's associations included Georgie Fame, Adelaide Hall, Keith Smith and Charlie Watts.

References

English jazz pianists
1940 births
1995 deaths
20th-century pianists